Vasa recta is Latin for straight vessels and may refer to:

 Vasa recta (kidney)
 Vasa recta (intestines)